Martin Jäger (born 20 December 1987) is a Swiss biathlete. He was born in Walenstadt. He has competed in the Biathlon World Cup, and represented Switzerland at the Biathlon World Championships 2016.

Biathlon results
All results are sourced from the International Biathlon Union.

World Championships
0 medals

*During Olympic seasons competitions are only held for those events not included in the Olympic program.
**The single mixed relay was added as an event in 2019.

References

External links

1987 births
Living people
Swiss male biathletes
Swiss male cross-country skiers
People from Walenstadt
Sportspeople from the canton of St. Gallen
21st-century Swiss people